Microbacterium mitrae is a Gram-positive, non-spore-forming and non-motile bacterium from the genus Microbacterium which has been isolated from a turban shell in Korea.

References 

Bacteria described in 2011
mitrae